The women's discus throw at the 2011 IPC Athletics World Championships was held at the QEII Stadium on 22-23, 25 and 29 January.

Medalists

F12
The Women's discus throw, F12 was held on January 22

The event included both F11 and F12 classified athletes:
F11 = visual impairment: may range from no light perception in either eye, to light perception with the inability to recognise the shape of a hand. 
F12 = visual impairment: may recognise the shape of a hand, have a visual acuity of 2/60 and/or visual field of less than 5 degrees.

China's Liangmin Zhang set a world record for athletes with an F11 classification, with a throw of 40.42.

Results

Final

Key:   WR = World Record

F35/36
The Women's discus throw, F35/36 was held on January 29

F35/36
F35 = good static balance, problems in dynamic balance, may need assistive devices for walking but not when standing or throwing, may have sufficient lower extremity function to do a run up when throwing. 
F36 = walk without assistance or assistive devices, more control problems with upper than lower limbs. All four limbs are involved. Hand control, grasp and release affected when throwing.

Results

Final

Key:   WR = World Record, CR = Championship Record, SB = Season Best

F37
The Women's discus throw, F37 was held on January 23

F37 = spasticity in an arm and leg on the same side, good functional ability on the non impaired side, good arm and hand control and follow through.

Results

Final

Key:   CR = Championship Record, AR = Asian Record, SB = Season Best

F40
The Women's discus throw, F40 was held on January 29

F40 =  dwarfism.

Results

Final

Key:   CR = Championship Record, AR = Area Record

F51/52/53
The Women's discus throw, F51/52/53 was held on January 29

F51/52/53
F51 = a weakness in shoulder function, the ability to bend but not straighten the elbow joint, no trunk or leg function, no movement in the fingers, can bend the wrists backwards but not forwards. 
F52 = good shoulder, elbow and wrist function, poor to normal finger flexion and extension, no trunk or leg function.
F53 = normal upper limb function, no abdominal, leg or lower spinal function.

Results

Final

Key:   SB = Season Best

F54/55/56
The Women's discus throw, F54/55/56 was held on January 25

F54/55/56
F54 = normal upper limb function, no abdominal or lower spinal function. 
F55 = normal upper limb function, may have partial to almost completely normal trunk function, no leg function.
F56 = normal upper limb and trunk function, some leg function, may have high bilateral above knee amputation.

Results

Final

Key:   AR = Area Record, SB = Season Best

F57/58
The Women's discus throw, F57/58 was held on January 29

F57/58
F57 = normal upper limb and trunk function, may have bilateral above knee amputations. 
F58 = normal upper limb and trunk function, a bilateral below knee amputation or single above knee amputation.

Results

Final

Key:   WR = World Record, AR = Area Record, CR = Championship Record, SB = Season Best

See also
List of IPC world records in athletics

References
General
Schedule and results, Official site of the 2011 IPC Athletics World Championships
IPC Athletics Classification Explained, Scottish Disability Sport
Specific

Discus throw
2011 in women's athletics
Discus throw at the World Para Athletics Championships